Songs of Drinking and Rebellion is the first studio album released by the indie rock band Spent, in 1995.  The album was released on Merge Records and was followed by a tour with labelmates Superchunk.  The album had no singles; however, a video for the song "View from a Staircase" was made.

Track listing

   Brewster Station – 3:03
   Excuse Me While I Drink Myself to Death – 3:47
   West – 2:35
   Minty Ballad – 2:52
   Sense of Decay – 4:27
   Bottled Mouth – 2:53
   Open Wide – 3:01
   Landscaper – 1:51
   Santa Claus to the Rescue – 1:36
   View from a Staircase – 4:19
   Halfshirt – 5:33
   Ready OK – 3:59
   Brighter Than Day – 3:18

References

 
 

1995 albums
Spent (band) albums